The 2010 Seguros Bolívar Open Bucaramanga was a professional tennis tournament played on outdoor red clay courts. It was part of the 2010 ATP Challenger Tour. It took place in Bucaramanga, Colombia between 25 and 31 January 2010.

ATP entrants

Seeds

 Rankings are as of January 18, 2010

Other entrants
The following players received wildcards into the singles main draw:
  Ricardo Corrente
  Alejandro González
  Sebastián Serrano
  Eduardo Struvay

The following players received entry from the qualifying draw:
  Facundo Bagnis
  Leonardo Kirche
  Guido Pella
  Guillermo Rivera Aránguiz

Champions

Singles

 Eduardo Schwank def.  Juan Pablo Brzezicki, 6–4, 6–2

Doubles

 Pere Riba /  Santiago Ventura def.  Marcelo Demoliner /  Rodrigo Guidolin, 6–2, 6–2

External links
Official website of Seguros Bolívar Tennis

2010 ATP Challenger Tour
Tennis tournaments in Colombia
2010
January 2010 sports events in South America
2010 in Colombian tennis